The Riverside County Regional Park and Open-Space District ("RivCoParks"; and commonly, Riverside County Parks) is a special district operating in Riverside County, California. The District’s focus encompasses providing high-quality recreational opportunities and preserving important features of the County’s Natural, Cultural and Historical heritage.

History
RivCoParks was founded in July 1926 when the Riverside County Board of Supervisors created a Board of Forestry to oversee what little open space the County had acquired up to that date. In 1959 the Board of Supervisors created a parks department and appointed a Parks Superintendent. In 1990 the parks department became a district during a general election and formed under the California Public Resources Code 5506.7. (a)..

The parks and facilities administered by RivCoParks vary greatly in size and character. Current inventory includes 71,669 acres of land, 160 miles of regional trail, 11 regional parks, 6 archeological sites, 4 nature centers, 4 historic sites, and 14 wildlife reserves. Some of the parks are wilderness areas, others include a variety of recreation attractions with opportunities for swimming, angling, boating, camping, biking, hiking, and horse riding.

The work of the District is supported by 3 commissions, 1 committee and 6 support groups, which raises funds for the improvement of the parks and programs. The District is a member of the National Association of Regional Parks and Open Space Officers (NACPRO), the California Association of Regional Parks and Open Space Administrators (CARPOSA), the National Recreation and Park Association (NRPA) and the California Parks and Recreation Society (CPRS).

Mission
The mission of the Riverside County Regional Parks and Open-Space District is to acquire, protect, manage, and interpret for the inspiration, use and enjoyment of all people, a well-balanced system of park-related places of outstanding scenic, recreational, and historical importance.

District Parks and Trails
 Bogart Park (transferred to the Beaumont-Cherry Valley Recreation and Park District in 2019)
 Box Springs Mountain Reserve
 Crestmore Manor (event facility and headquarters)
 Gilman Historic Ranch and Wagon Museum
 Goose Flats Wildlife Area
 Harford Springs
 Hidden Valley Wildlife Area
 Hurkey Creek Park
 Idyllwild Park
 Jensen Alvarado Ranch
 Kabian Park
 Lake Cahuilla Recreation Area – a modern reservoir/lake named after the prehistoric Lake Cahuilla
 Lake Skinner Recreation Area
 Lawler Lodge/Cabins
 Louis Robidoux Nature Center
 Mayflower Park
 Maze Stone Park
 McCall Memorial Park
 McIntyre Park
 Miller Park
 Multi-Species Reserve
 Rancho Jurupa Regional Parks
 San Timoteo Canyon Schoolhouse
 Santa Rosa Plateau Ecological Reserve

References

Further reading

External links
 

Parks in Riverside County, California